Gerra sevorsa is a species of moth first described by Augustus Radcliffe Grote in 1882. Its range extends from the US states of New Mexico and Arizona south through most of Central America.

References

Agaristinae
Moths described in 1882